Lieutenant General Mahmud Ahmed  (b. 1944) is a retired three-star rank army general in the Pakistan Army who served as the Director-General of the Inter-Services Intelligence from 1999 to 2001.

He played a crucial role in sponsorship of armed insurgency in Indian-administered Kashmir and commanded the X Corps against the Indian Army during the Kargil War in 1999, and was identified as one of the four army generals who helped initiate the 1999 Pakistani coup d'état against the civilian government of Prime Minister Nawaz Sharif, also in 1999. As the DG ISI, Mahmud actively supported the sponsorship of the Islamic fundamentalism by endorsing the Talibans in Afghanistan under its emir Mullah Omar in 2000.

Despite being responsible of stabilizing Gen. Pervez Musharraf's control over the civilian government and later his presidency, Lt-Gen. Ahmad was notably forced to retire from his commission when his involvement surfaced in alleged financing of the Hamburg cell led by Mohamed Atta, an al-Qaeda operative in 2000-01.

Biography
Mahmud Ahmed was born in 1944 in Ludhiana, Punjab in India, and joined the Pakistan Army in 1964 where he did his combat duty, first participating in second war with India in 1965. His family emigrated from India to Bhaiwala, Faisalabad Pakistan after India's partition on 14/15 August 1947. He secured his graduation from the Lawrence College in Murree before attending Pakistan Military Academy in Kakul in 1965.

He passed out from the PMA Kakul in 1966 where he commissioned as 2nd-Lt in the 16th Self-Propelled (SP) in the Corps of Artillery. Lieutenant Ahmed was the regimental colleague of then army Captain Pervez Musharraf. He participated in the third war with India on the western front, and he was very critical of defence spending by the Ayub administration after 1965. .

In the 1980s and 1990s, Ahmed served in the ISI where he worked under Lt-Gen. Hamid Gul.

In 1994–95, Major-General Ahmed commanded the 23rd Infantry Division as its GOC, stationed in Jhelum in Punjab, Pakistan.

His career in the military is mostly spent in the military intelligence and became the Director-General of the Military Intelligence (DG MI), when he took it over from then-Maj-Gen. Ali Kuli Khan in October 1995. In June 1998, Maj-Gen. Ahmed was promoted to three-star rank, Lieutenant-General and was moved the President of the National Defence University (NDU) in Islamabad by then-Chairman joint chiefs Gen. Jehangir Karamat.

X Corps and Kargil war with India

In October 1998, -Chairman joint chiefs Gen. Pervez Musharraf appointed Lt-Gen. Ahmed as the field commander of the X Corps, and as soon as he was appointed to command the X Corps the planning of the covert infiltration in Indian Kashmir begin to implemented under Lt-Gen. Aziz Khan, the CGS under Gen. Musharraf in Rawalpindi. In the military, Lt-Gen. Ahmed was described as ultraconservative, professional and kind to his subordinates though some found him to be control minded with a very short-temper.

Lt-Gen. Ahmed greatly aided in providing the tactical support of mass troop infiltration, starting first by closely and micromanaging the troop deployment near the LoC. In July 1999, he provided the briefing to Prime Minister Nawaz Sharif over the troop deployments, eventually giving a go-ahead for the military operation.

After the Kargil war, the Pakistani Investigative journalist news reports identified that there were four army generals who were in much control of the area contingency plans in Kargil including Lt-Gen. Aziz Khan, the CGS under Gen. Musharraf, Lt-Gen. Shahid Aziz of ISI's Analysis Wing, and Lt-Gen. Jan Orakzai, commanding the XI Corps, besides Lt-Gen. Mahmud. There were no official military inquiries into this incident nor there were any subsequent evidence that led to the punishments of those responsible for such incidents.

On 12 October 1999, Lt-Gen. Ahmed refused to accept to follow the orders of new chain of command set up by then-army chief Gen. Ziauddin Butt and ordered his X Corps to seize the control of the Prime Minister's Secretariat while Lt-Gen. Aziz Khan, the CGS under Gen. Musharraf, took control of the Jinnah Terminal in Karachi.

Director ISI (1999–2001)

U.S. visit, 9/11 attacks, and removal 

After the martial law in 1999, Lt-Gen. Ahmed was subsequently appointed as the Director-General of the Inter-Services Intelligence (ISI), and his tenureship was marked with alleged terror financing of al-Qaeda and sponsoring the Talibans in Afghanistan. On 17 March 2001, Lt-Gen. Ahmad was appointed as the Colonel commandant of the Corps of Artillery at the Artillery Regimental Center on 17 March 2001. Mahmud was later replaced by Lt General Khalid Kidwai as the colonel commandant on 13 October 2004.

In 2001, Lt-Gen. Ahmad regularly visited the United States where he consulted with The Pentagon and CIA officials in the Bush administration in the weeks before and after terrorist attacks took place in New York on 11 September 2001. In fact, he was with U.S. Republican Congressman Porter Goss and U.S. Democratic Senator Bob Graham in Washington, D.C., discussing Osama bin Laden over breakfast, when the attacks of September 11, 2001 took place in New York, United States.

On the morning of Sept. 12, the deputy secretary of state, Richard Armitage, told Mahmood that Pakistan had to make a choice "you are either 100 percent with us or 100 percent against us—there is no gray area." Mahmood expressed willingness to cooperate, however in the afternoon, he told George Tenet, the CIA director, that Mullah Omar, the Taliban chief, was a religious man not a man of violence. On September 16, Musharraf sent a delegation to the Taliban with the mission to convince them to hand over Osama bin Laden which included Lieutenant General Mahmood, and other religious figures. It was learned later that mission actually encouraged Mullah Omar to start a jihad against the US if it attacked Afghanistan. 

On 9 October 2001, the Pakistani and the U.S. news media reported that "U.S. authorities sought his removal after confirming the fact that $100,000 were wired to WTC hijacker Mohamed Atta from Pakistan by Ahmad Umar Sheikh at the insistence of Lt-Gen. Mahmud." Mahmud Ahmed was eventually forced to leave the ISI and was also linked to another 9/11 hijacker Mustafa al-Hawsawi.  Despite his loyalty to and backing of Pres. Pervez Musharraf, Lt-Gen. Ahmed was immediately removed from the directorship of the ISI, when President Musharraf terminated his commission under US pressure, and was replaced by Lt-Gen. Ehsan ul Haq.

Post-retirement and Islamic missionary activity
After this termination, Ahmed critiqued President Pervez Musharraf's policy on siding with the United States, without effectively addressing the issue of containing the terrorists organizations.

He viewed the American attack on Afghanistan with great suspicion, and had held sympathetic views towards the Talibans in Afghanistan. He later regretted his role in playing his part in bringing to help stabilize Gen. Pervez Musharraf's role against the civilian government when he joined the Alliance for Restoration of Democracy that viewed to removing Musharraf's administration. Ahmed opposed the US invasion of Afghanistan.

After this termination, Ahmed publicly came out against President Pervez Musharraf's policy of siding with the United States, without effectively addressing the issue of containing the terrorists organizations.

He is now a member of Tablighi Jamaat and preaches the teaching of Islam.

Works 
He wrote a book initially titled "The Myth of 1965 Victory". It was carefully researched and included numerous maps and other details. It questioned the official Pakistani view about winning the war, and acknowledged that the war was initiated "as a clandestine guerrilla struggle".  Upon Musharraf's directive, almost all the copies of the book were bought by Pakistan Army to prevent circulation because the topic was "too sensitive". The book was published with the revised title "History of Indo Pak War 1965". It was published by Services Book Club, a part of the Pakistan military. A few copies of the book have survived in libraries. A version was published in India as "Illusion of Victory: A Military History of the Indo-Pak War-1965" by Lexicon Publishers. A second reprint of the book was published recently in 2017 in Pakistan.

Awards and decorations

See also

Gang of Four in Pakistan Army
Pakistan Army and state-sponsored terrorism
Anti-American sentiment in Pakistan
ISI in Afghanistan
State within a state
Power and politics
Islamic fundamentalism
Blowback (intelligence)

References

External links
9/11 and the Smoking Gun - A Real Smoking Gun. Asia Times.
September 11. 22 July 2004. The Guardian.
Mahmood Ahmed. 911 Timeline.
Mahmoud Ahmad. NNDB.
India helped FBI trace ISI-terrorist links. Times of India.

 

1944 births
People from Ludhiana
Punjabi people
Tablighi Jamaat people
Lawrence College Ghora Gali alumni
Pakistan Military Academy alumni
Pakistani military personnel of the Indo-Pakistani War of 1971
National Defence University, Pakistan alumni
People of Inter-Services Intelligence
Pakistani Islamists
Pakistani generals
Academic staff of the National Defence University, Pakistan
People of the Kargil War
1999 in Pakistan
Directors General of Inter-Services Intelligence
Pakistani Salafis
People associated with the September 11 attacks
9/11 conspiracy theorists
Pakistani Muslim activists
Pakistani anti–Iraq War activists
Living people
Pakistani conspiracy theorists